Alcor is a binary star system in the constellation of Ursa Major. It is the fainter companion of Mizar, the two stars forming a naked eye double in the handle of the Big Dipper (or Plough) asterism in Ursa Major. The two both lie about 83 light-years away from the Sun, as measured by the Hipparcos astrometry satellite.

Nomenclature
Alcor has the Flamsteed designation 80 Ursae Majoris. Alcor derives from Arabic  , meaning 'faint one'; notable as a faintly perceptible companion of Mizar.

In 2016, the International Astronomical Union organized a Working Group on Star Names (WGSN) to catalog and standardize proper names for stars. The WGSN's first bulletin of July 2016 included a table of the first two batches of names approved by the WGSN; which included Alcor for 80 UMa.

Mizar and Alcor

With normal eyesight Alcor appears at about 12 minutes of arc from the second-magnitude star Mizar. Alcor is of magnitude 3.99 and spectral class A5V.

Mizar's and Alcor's proper motions show they move together, along with most of the other stars of the Big Dipper except Dubhe and Alkaid, as members of the Ursa Major Moving Group, a mostly dispersed group of stars sharing a common birth. However, it has yet to be demonstrated conclusively that they are gravitationally bound. Recent studies indicate that Alcor and Mizar are somewhat closer together than previously thought: approximately 74,000 ± 39,000 AU, or 0.5–1.5 light-years. The uncertainty is due to our uncertainty about the exact distances from us. If they are exactly the same distance from us (somewhat unlikely) then the distance between them is only .

Alcor B

In 2009, Alcor was discovered to have a companion star Alcor B, a magnitude 8.8 red dwarf.

Alcor B was discovered independently by two groups. One group led by Eric Mamajek (University of Rochester) and colleagues at Steward Observatory University of Arizona used adaptive optics on the 6.5-meter telescope at MMT Observatory. Another led by Neil Zimmerman, a graduate student at Columbia University and member of Project 1640, an international collaborative team that includes astrophysicists at the American Museum of Natural History, the University of Cambridge's Institute of Astronomy, the California Institute of Technology, and NASA's Jet Propulsion Laboratory, used the 5-meter Hale Telescope at Palomar Observatory.

Alcor B is one second of arc away from Alcor A. Its spectral type is M3-4 and it is a main-sequence star, a red dwarf.

Alcor A and B are situated 1.2 light-years away from, and are co-moving with, the Mizar quadruple system, making the system the second-closest stellar sextuplet—only Castor is closer. The Mizar–Alcor stellar sextuple system belongs to the Ursa Major Moving Group, a stellar group of stars of similar ages and velocities, and the closest cluster-like object to Earth.

Other names
In traditional Indian astronomy, Alcor was known as Arundhati, wife of one of the Saptarishi.

In Arabic, Alcor is also known as Al-Sahja (the rhythmical form of the usual al-Suhā) meaning 'forgotten', 'lost', or 'neglected'.

In the Miꞌkmaq myth of the great bear and the seven hunters, Mizar is Chickadee and Alcor is his cooking pot.

Military namesakes
USS Alcor (AD-34) and USS Alcor (AK-259) are both United States Navy ships.

References

External links
 Alcor at Jim Kaler's Stars website
 

A-type main-sequence stars
Ursae Majoris, g
Big Dipper
Ursae Majoris, 80
2
Alcor
Alcor
Ursa Major (constellation)
5062
065477
116842
BD+55 1603
M-type main-sequence stars